The Gallifrey Chronicles may refer to:
The Gallifrey Chronicles (1991 book), a Doctor Who book written by John Peel
The Gallifrey Chronicles (2005 novel), a Doctor Who novel written by Lance Parkin